Marcelo Minhoto Ferraz de Sampaio (born 24 February 1964) is a Brazilian handball player. He competed at the 1992 Summer Olympics and the 1996 Summer Olympics.

References

External links
 

1964 births
Living people
Brazilian male handball players
Olympic handball players of Brazil
Handball players at the 1992 Summer Olympics
Handball players at the 1996 Summer Olympics
Handball players from São Paulo
Pan American Games bronze medalists for Brazil
Pan American Games medalists in handball
Medalists at the 1987 Pan American Games
Medalists at the 1995 Pan American Games
Pan American Games silver medalists for Brazil
20th-century Brazilian people